Kirchheimer is a surname of German or Yiddish origin. the suffix
means from/of in either language. "Kirch" refers to the German word for church. "Heimer"
in either language refers to home. It is a last name found among  Ashkenazi Jews. Kirschheim is a known variant. 

Notable people with the surname include:
 Otto Kirchheimer, a German jurist of Jewish ancestry
 Manfred Kirchheimer, born 1931, NYC professor
NYTimes citation: https://www.nytimes.com/2006/12/10/business/yourmoney/calling-all-cheats-meet-your-enemy.html-->

References

Ashkenazi surnames
German-language surnames
Jewish surnames
Yiddish-language surnames